Benjamin Demir (born 16 May 1996) is a Macedonian footballer playing with FK Vardar.

Club career
Born in Skopje, he started playing in the youth section of local powerhouse FK Vardar. He had a loan spell at FK Pelister, but his senior debut will happened already after signing with Croatian side NK Inter Zaprešić where he played the first half of the 2014–15 Druga HNL. During winter-break he returned to Macedonia and joined FK Gorno Lisiče, however, in February he returned to Croatia and signed with powerhouse HNK Hajduk Split playing the rest of the season with their reserves team. In summer 2015 he returned to Maceodnia and joined FK Teteks debuting with them in the 2015–16 Macedonian First Football League. During summer 2017 he signed with FK Pelister, however, soon after he left the club without debuting for them. He joined FK Rabotnichki during winter-breal of 2016–17. In summer 2017 he moved to FK Skopje where he played the entire 2017–18 Macedonian First Football League. In summer 2018 he moved abroad again, this time to Serbia, and joined FK Spartak Subotica where he played the first half of the 2018–19 Serbian SuperLiga. During winter-break he returned to Macedonia and signed with FK Makedonija Gjorče Petrov.

International career
Benjamin Demir represented Macedonia at U17 level in 2012, and in U19 level in 2014. He also received calls for Macedonian U21 side in 2018 but failed to debut.

Personal life
He is the son of former footballer Erol Demir. He has daughter Dora. His wife is Teamina Demir.

References

1996 births
Living people
Footballers from Skopje
Association football midfielders
Macedonian footballers
North Macedonia youth international footballers
FK Vardar players
FK Teteks players
NK Inter Zaprešić players
FK Gorno Lisiče players
HNK Hajduk Split players
FK Pelister players
FK Rabotnički players
FK Skopje players
FK Spartak Subotica players
FK Makedonija Gjorče Petrov players
FK Shkupi players
Macedonian First Football League players
First Football League (Croatia) players
Serbian SuperLiga players
Macedonian expatriate footballers
Expatriate footballers in Croatia
Macedonian expatriate sportspeople in Croatia
Expatriate footballers in Serbia
Macedonian expatriate sportspeople in Serbia